The 1984 World Women's Curling Championship, the women's world curling championship, was held from 25 to 30 March at the Perth Ice Arena in Perth, Scotland.

Teams

Round-robin standings

Round-robin results

Draw 1

Draw 2

Draw 3

Draw 4

Draw 5

Draw 6

Draw 7

Draw 8

Draw 9

Tiebreakers

Round 1

Round 2

Playoffs

Semifinals

Final

References

World Women's Curling Championship
1984 in women's curling
Sport in Perth, Scotland
1984 in Scottish sport
Women's curling competitions in Scotland
March 1984 sports events in the United Kingdom
1984 in Scottish women's sport
International curling competitions hosted by Scotland